Dirva is a Lithuanian-language weekly newspaper of Cleveland, Ohio established in 1916.

History
The paper started as Santaika ("Peace") on November 25, 1915 and was renamed as Dirva ("Field") on August 28, 1916.  In 1920, Dirva was the only Lithuanian newspaper in Cleveland. Dirva circulated to other cities, particularly Pittsburgh and Detroit, and other states with Lithuanian American communities (Connecticut, Pennsylvania, Maryland, Michigan).

Initially, Dirva was published by the Ohio Lithuanian Publishing Company, run by businessman Apolonas B. Bartuševičius (Bartoszewicz). In 1925, newspaper's editor Kazys S. Karpius (Karpavicius) gained a controlling interest in the newspaper. During World War II, owner-editor Karpius maintained a centrist position as both anti-fascist and anti-communist. The newspaper generally published local, national, and international news especially if related to Lithuania or Lithuanians. It also published other items, including announcements, movie reviews, union news, excerpts from fiction, and articles about authors.

In 1952, the publishing of Dirva was taken over by the non-profit American Lithuanian Press & Radio Association "Viltis". On 30 July 1975, the printing press of Dirva burned down together with equipment and archives. However, the newspaper was quickly reestablished.

As more Lithuanians arrived to United States from displaced persons camps in post-World War II Europe, Dirva was able to increase its circulation from weekly to twice a week in 1958–1959 and three times a week in 1960–1968. It reduced its circulation to twice a week in 1968, returning to its original weekly schedule in 1980 and then reducing the circulation to twice a month in 2006. In 1995, its circulation was 3,000 copies per issue.

As of 2022, Dirva remained as one of the last Lithuanian-language American newspapers.

Editors
The newspaper was edited by:
 Vincas K. Jokubynas – 1916–1917
 Kazys S. Karpius (Karpavičius) – 1918–1948
 Vincas Rastenis – 1948–1950
 Balys Gaidžiūnas – 1951–1962, 1985–1994
 Jonas Čiuberkis – 1962–1968
 Vytautas Gedgaudas – 1968–1985
 Anicetas Bundonis – 1994–1995
 Jonas Jasaitis – 1996–2001
 Editorial board – 2001–2005
 Vytautas Radžius – 2005–2013
 Gediminas Markevičius – since 2014

References

External links
 Full-text archives 1916–2020
 National Digital Newspaper Program
 Newspapers.com

1916 establishments in Ohio
Publications established in 1916
Newspapers published in Cleveland
Lithuanian-language newspapers published in the United States
Lithuanian-American culture in Ohio